Mileston is an unincorporated community located in Holmes County, Mississippi.

Mileston is located on the Canadian National Railway.

History
Mileston is named for a former plantation. In 1940, the United States government purchased approximately ten-thousand acres of the former W. E. Jones estate as part of the Resettlement Administration. The land was split into seventy individual plots with an additional cooperative farm that included thirty plots. The community was home to a cotton gin, school, store, blacksmith shop, and medical clinic. W. Ralph Eubanks' father taught agronomy at the Mileston school.

A post office operated under the name Mileston from 1888 to 1953.

Much of the land in Mileston is owned by descendants of the original African American sharecroppers. In 2000, the West Holmes Community Development Organization and the state of Mississippi began operating a farmers' market in Mileston.

Marion Post Wolcott documented people and scenes from the Mileston plantation in 1939 as part of her work with the Farm Security Administration.

Civil Rights Movement
Mileston was the epicenter of the Civil Rights Movement in Holmes County. In March 1963, the Student Nonviolent Coordinating Committee began work in Holmes County after being contacted by residents of Mileston. The next month, fourteen African Americans from Mileston (known as the First Fourteen) traveled to Lexington and unsuccessfully registered to vote.

One of the first citizenship schools in Mississippi was held at the Mileston community center and many attendees became members of the Mississippi Freedom Democratic Party.

Education
Residents are in the Holmes County School District, and are assigned to Holmes County Central High School.

The school district previously operated a school in Mileston: previously Mileston Elementary School (K-6), later Mileston Middle School, which housed up to 130 students.

Notable person
 Hartman Turnbow, activist during the Civil Rights Movement

Images

References

Unincorporated communities in Holmes County, Mississippi
Unincorporated communities in Mississippi